Ondřej Vrzal (born 1 March 1987) is a Czech former football player who played in the Czech First League for clubs including Dukla Prague, Viktoria Plzeň and Jablonec.

Career
Vrzal started playing football with FSC Libuš as a boy, later moving to the youth team of Slavia Prague. He joined FC Viktoria Plzeň in 2007, taking part in 10 league games during his time with the club. While at Plzeň Vrzal suffered a cruciate ligament injury. He joined Dukla Prague, then of the second league, on loan in February 2010. After the club finished the 2009–10 season in sixth position, Vrzal was re-signed to Dukla on a year-long loan. Vrzal finally made his move to Dukla permanent in June 2012, signing a two-year contract. During the winter break of the 2013–14 season, Vrzal joined FK Baumit Jablonec on loan. After making three league appearances for Jablonec, Vrzal was one of a number of players released by the club at the end of the season. Vrzal joined Bohemians 1905 on loan in the winter break of the 2016–17 season.

Career statistics

References

External links
 
 Guardian Football

Czech footballers
1987 births
Living people
Czech First League players
SK Slavia Prague players
FC Viktoria Plzeň players
FK Dukla Prague players
FK Jablonec players
Bohemians 1905 players
Association football defenders